This is a list of the Parliaments of the Ontario Legislative Assembly, the legislature of the Canadian province of Ontario, since Canadian Confederation in 1867.   The Legislative Assembly has existed since 1867 when the British North America Act, 1867 severed the Province of Canada into two new provinces, with the portion then called Canada West becoming Ontario.  For the Parliaments prior to Confederation, see Parliament of the Province of Canada (1841 to 1867) and Parliament of Upper Canada (1791 to 1841).

List of Parliaments

 Although they had fewer seats than the Conservatives, the Liberals formed a minority government with the support of the NDP.

Sources

Legislative Assemblies